Belisario Frías  is a corregimiento in San Miguelito District, Panamá Province, Panama with a population of 44,571 as of 2010. It was created by Law 21 of June 27, 2000. Its population as of 2000 was 46,794.

References

Corregimientos of Panamá Province
San Miguelito District